Aloha Airlines Flight 243 (IATA: AQ243, ICAO: AAH243) was a scheduled Aloha Airlines flight between Hilo and Honolulu in Hawaii. On April 28, 1988, a Boeing 737-297 serving the flight suffered extensive damage after an explosive decompression in flight, caused by part of the fuselage breaking due to poor maintenance and metal fatigue. The plane was able to land safely at Kahului Airport on Maui. The one fatality, flight attendant Clarabelle "C.B." Lansing, was ejected from the airplane. Another 65 passengers and crew were injured. The substantial damage inflicted by the decompression, the loss of one cabin crew member, and the safe landing of the aircraft established the incident as a significant event in the history of aviation, with far-reaching effects on aviation safety policies and procedures.

Aircraft and crew 

The aircraft involved was a Boeing 737-200 and was the 152nd Boeing 737 airframe built at the Renton assembly plant. It was built in 1969 and delivered to Aloha Airlines as a new aircraft. When delivered to Aloha, it was named King Kalaniopuu, after Kalaniʻōpuʻu, until it was leased to Air California/AirCal, after which the name was reassigned to N728AL. When N73711 returned to Aloha, it received its second name, Queen Liliuokalani after Liliʻuokalani. While the airframe had accumulated 35,496 flight hours prior to the accident, those hours included nearly 90,000 flight cycles (takeoffs and landings), owing to its use on short flights. This amounted to more than twice the number of flight cycles for which it was designed. At the time of the incident, Aloha Airlines operated the two highest flight-cycle Boeing 737s in the world, with the incident aircraft being number two.

The captain of the flight was 44-year-old Robert Schornstheimer, an experienced pilot with 8,500 flight hours, 6,700 of which were in Boeing 737s. The first officer was 36-year-old Madeline "Mimi" Tompkins, who also had significant experience flying the 737, having logged 3,500 of her total 8,000 flight hours in that particular Boeing model.

Incident
Flight 243 departed from Hilo International Airport at 13:25 HST on April 28, 1988, with five crew members and 90 passengers on board, bound for Honolulu. Nothing unusual was noted during the pre-departure inspection of the aircraft, which had already completed three round-trip flights from Honolulu to Hilo, Maui, and Kauai earlier that day, all uneventful. Meteorological conditions were checked, but no advisories for weather phenomena were reported along the air route, per AIRMETs or SIGMETs.

The captain felt the aircraft roll to the left and right, and the controls went loose; the first officer noticed pieces of grey insulation floating above the cabin. The cockpit door had broken away and the captain could see "blue sky where the first-class ceiling had been."

One fatality occurred, 58-year-old flight attendant Clarabelle "C.B." Lansing, who was swept out of the airplane while standing near the fifth-row seats; her body was never found. Lansing was a veteran flight attendant of 37 years at the time of the incident. Eight other people suffered serious injuries. All of the passengers had been seated and wearing their seat belts during the depressurization.

First Officer Tompkins was the pilot flying at the time of the incident; Captain Schornstheimer took over controls and performed an immediate emergency descent. The crew declared an emergency and diverted to Kahului Airport for an emergency landing. During the approach to the airport, the left engine failed, and the flight crew was unsure if the nose gear was lowered correctly. Nevertheless, they were able to land normally on Runway 2, thirteen minutes after the incident. Upon landing, the aircraft's emergency evacuation slides were deployed and passengers quickly evacuated from the aircraft. Sixty-five people were reported injured, eight of them with serious injuries. At the time, Maui had no plan in place for an emergency of this type. The injured were taken to the hospital in tour vans belonging to Akamai Tours, driven by office personnel and mechanics, as the island only had two ambulances. Two of the Akamai drivers were former paramedics and established a triage on the runway. The aircraft was written off.

Aftermath

The aircraft was damaged beyond repair and was dismantled on site. Additional damage to the airplane included damaged and dented horizontal stabilizers, both of which had been struck by flying debris. Some of the metal debris had also struck the aircraft's vertical stabilizer, causing slight damage. The leading edges of both wings and both engine cowlings had also sustained damage.

The piece of the fuselage blown off the aircraft was never found. Investigation by the U. S. National Transportation Safety Board (NTSB) concluded that the accident was caused by metal fatigue exacerbated by crevice corrosion. The aircraft was 19 years old and operated in a coastal environment, with exposure to salt and humidity.

During an interview, passenger Gayle Yamamoto told investigators that she had noticed a crack in the fuselage upon boarding, but did not notify anyone.

Construction 
The incident aircraft was line number 152. All 737s constructed after line number 291 included an additional outer layer of skin or doubler sheet at the lap joint of the fuselage. In the construction of the incident aircraft, this doubler sheet was not used. For airplane line number 291 and before, cold bonding had been used, with fasteners used to maintain surface contact in the joint, allowing bonding adhesive to transfer load within the joint. This cold-bonded joint used an epoxy-impregnated woven scrim cloth to join the edges of  skin panels. These epoxy cloths were reactive at room temperature, so they were stored at dry ice temperatures until used in manufacture. The bond cured at room temperature after assembly. The cold-bonding process reduced the overall weight and manufacturing cost. Fuselage hoop loads (circumferential loads within the skins due to pressurization of the cabin) were intended to be transferred through the bonded joint, rather than through the rivets, allowing the use of lighter, thinner fuselage skin panels with no degradation in fatigue life.

The additional outer layer construction improved the joint by:
Eliminating the knife-edge fatigue detail, which resulted from the countersinking of the panels for flush rivets in a disbonded upper skin, and
Eliminating the corrosion concern associated with the scrim cloth, which could wick moisture into the lap joint

Conclusion 

The NTSB investigation determined that the quality of inspection and maintenance programs was deficient. Fuselage examinations were scheduled during the night, which made carrying out an adequate inspection of the aircraft's outer skin more difficult.

Also, the fuselage failure initiated in the lap joint along S-10L; the failure mechanism was a result of multiple-site fatigue cracking of the skin adjacent to rivet holes along the lap joint upper rivet row and tear strap disbond, which negated the fail-safe characteristics of the fuselage. Finally, the fatigue cracking initiated from the knife edge associated with the countersunk lap joint rivet holes; the knife edge concentrated stresses that were transferred through the rivets because of lap joint disbonding.

The NTSB concluded in its final report on the accident:

The National Transportation Safety Board determines that the probable cause of this accident was the failure of the Aloha Airlines maintenance program to detect the presence of significant disbonding and fatigue damage which ultimately led to failure of the lap joint at S-10L and the separation of the fuselage upper lobe. Contributing to the accident were the failure of Aloha Airlines management to supervise properly its maintenance force; the failure of the FAA to require Airworthiness Directive 87-21-08 inspection of all the lap joints proposed by Boeing Alert Service Bulletin SB 737-53A1039; and the lack of a complete terminating action (neither generated by Boeing nor required by the FAA) after the discovery of early production difficulties in the B-737 cold-bond lap joint, which resulted in low bond durability, corrosion, and premature fatigue cracking.

One board member dissented, arguing that the fatigue cracking was clearly the probable cause, but that Aloha Airlines maintenance should not be singled out because failures by the FAA, Boeing, and Aloha Airlines maintenance each were contributing factors to the disaster.

In popular culture 
 The events of Flight 243 were featured in "Hanging by a Thread", a season-three (2005) episode of the Canadian TV series Mayday (called Air Emergency and Air Disasters in the U.S. and Air Crash Investigation in the UK and elsewhere around the world). The flight was also included in  Mayday season six (2007) Science of Disaster special titled "Ripped Apart".
 The story of Flight 243 was the subject of the 1990 made-for-television movie called Miracle Landing.
 A memorial garden was opened in 1995 to honor Lansing at Honolulu International Airport.
 It is featured in season 1, episode 2, of the TV show Why Planes Crash, in an episode called "Breaking Point".

See also

 United Airlines Flight 811 – A similar incident, also in Hawaii, in which an explosive decompression caused nine passengers to be ejected from the aircraft, but the crew was able to perform a safe landing.
 Far Eastern Air Transport Flight 103 - An identical aircraft type that disintegrated in midair due to metal fatigue cracking and severe corrosion, killing all on board.
China Airlines Flight 611, a Boeing 747-200 that suffered a structural failure after a maintenance error was made in fixing fatigue cracking from a tail strike. 
Chalk's Ocean Airways Flight 101, a flight that suffered a structural failure due to improper corrosion repairs. 
 List of notable decompression accidents and incidents.

References

External links
 Pre-incident photos of N73711
Aloha Air 243, film of rescue operation, with passenger interviews - documentary clip

Aloha Airlines accidents and incidents
Aviation accidents and incidents in the United States in 1988
Airliner accidents and incidents in Hawaii
Disasters in Hawaii
Airliner accidents and incidents caused by in-flight structural failure
Airliner accidents and incidents involving in-flight depressurization
1988 in Hawaii
Accidents and incidents involving the Boeing 737 Original
April 1988 events in the United States